Mohammed Khalfan may refer to:

Mohammed Khalfan (footballer, born 1994), Qatari footballer
Mohammed Khalfan (footballer, born 1992), Emirati footballer
 Mohammed Khalfan (footballer, born 1998), Emirati footballer